Señorita República Dominicana 1967 was held on January 29, 1967. There were 24 candidates who competed for the national crown. The winner represented the Dominican Republic at the Miss Universe 1967. The Virreina al Miss Mundo will enter Miss World 1967. The Virreina al Miss Internacional will enter Miss International 1967. Only the 25 province, 1 municipality entered. On the top 10 they showed their evening gown and answered questions so they could go to the top 5. In the top 5 they would answer more questions.

Results

Señorita República Dominicana 1967 : Jeanette Morena Rey García (Duarte)
Virreina al Miss Mundo : Margarita Rosa Rueckschnat Schott (Distrito Nacional)
Virreina al Miss Internacional : Vivien Susana Estrella Cevallos (Santiago)
1st Runner Up : Margarita Cury (Delta Neiba)
2nd Runner Up : Maira Fortunato (Puerto Plata)

Top 10

Lori Rey (La Vega)
Ana Araujo (Dajabón)
Milka Maldonado (Sánchez Ramírez)
Martha Antonio (Monte Cristi)
Teresita Acta (Espaillat)

Special awards
 Miss Rostro Bello – Lori Rey (La Vega)
 Miss Photogenic (voted by press reporters) - Sarah Reunaux-Flemaux (La Altagracia)
 Miss Congeniality (voted by Miss Dominican Republic Universe contestants) - Aida Roman (Valverde)

Delegates

 Azua - Lourdes Evangelina Santiago Cardona
 Ciudad Santo Domingo - Milagros Carola Mir Polanco
 Dajabón - Ana Dilia Araujo López
 Delta Neiba - Margarita Karina Cury Vásquez
 Distrito Nacional - Margarita Rosa Rueckschnat Schott
 Duarte - Jeanette Morena Rey García
 Espaillat - Teresita Lucía Acta Peralta
 La Altagracia - Sarah Elisa Reunaux-Flemaux Rivera
 La Estrelleta - Angelita María Bodden Tejada
 La Vega - Lori Magali Rey Garcia
 Monte Cristi - Martha Rosina Antonio Felíz
 Pedernales - Argelina Lourel Nefer Medina
 Peravia - María Catarina del Rosario Díaz
 Puerto Plata - Maira Zeneida Fortunato de los Reyes
 Salcedo - Vivien Estrella Moore Petrés
 Samaná - Ana Catalina Pulajs Nolasco
 Sánchez Ramírez - Milka Susana Maldonado Arias
 San Cristóbal - Gladys María Cruz Pichardo
 San Juan de la Maguana - Ana Josefa Puello Báez
 San Pedro - Gladis Josefina Villeta Cisneros
 Santiago - Vivien Susana Estrella Cevallos
 Santiago Rodríguez - Rosa Ivelisse Cacahuate Francisco
 Séibo - Altagracia Inés Abel de la Rosa
 Valverde - Aida Maritza Roman Quiros

Miss Dominican Republic
1967 beauty pageants
1967 in the Dominican Republic